Marian High School may refer to:

 Marian High School (Indiana), United States
 Marian High School (Massachusetts), United States
 Marian High School (Michigan), United States
 Marian High School (Nebraska), United States

See also 
 Marian Catholic High School (disambiguation)
 Purcell Marian High School, Ohio, United States